Guillermo F. Hernández, better known as Gilmer Hernandez, is a former Sheriff’s Deputy of Edwards County, Texas from Rocksprings, Texas who was convicted on a  charge of violation of civil rights of an illegal alien.

Border incident and prosecution
On April 14, 2005, Deputy Hernandez stopped a vehicle for running a red light. After coming to a stop, the driver who had hidden several illegal aliens in his vehicle tried to flee, nearly hitting Hernandez in the process. Hernandez fired several shots at the vehicle, aiming for the tires. When the vehicle halted due to the blown tires, several people fled the vehicle. One of the bullets Hernandez fired injured a woman in the vehicle, shattering some of her teeth.

The initial investigation by the Texas Rangers and members of the ATF cleared Hernandez of any wrongdoing. However, over a year later, the United States Department of Justice reopened the case under U.S. Attorney Johnny Sutton. On December 1, 2006 Hernandez was convicted for violation of civil rights of the injured person on the grounds that he should not have shot at the fleeing vehicle since his life was not in danger.  Defense contested that Hernandez did believe that his life was in danger. 
Hernandez was sentenced to a prison term of 12 months and one day.

Reaction
The guilty verdict surprised the Rocksprings community and triggered many responses, most in opposition to the verdict.

Texas Congressman Ted Poe defended the deputy by stating  that the  “Federal Government is more concerned about people illegally invading America than it is about the men who protect America. Once again, our government is on the wrong side of the border war.” 

The case has been linked to those of convicted border guards Ignacio Ramos and Jose Compean by dubbing them “The Texas Three”, all involved in Mexican border incidents with smuggling, illegal aliens, use of firearms, and prosecuted by Johnny Sutton . According to America's Most Wanted, action on part of the Mexican government demanding that the "crime" will not be unpunished may have pressured the prosecution.

Release
Hernandez was released from jail after serving 10 months of the 366-day sentence.

See also
 Ignacio Ramos
 Jose Compean

References

External links
 Free Gilmer web site
 Conviction - A play based on the Gilmer Hernandez situation
 Convicted Rocksprings Sheriff Deputy Gilmer Hernandez speaks from behind bars
 Rocksprings, Texas sheriff says his deputy victimized by overzealous federal prosecutor

Living people
Police brutality in the United States
Police officers convicted of assault
Year of birth missing (living people)
People from Edwards County, Texas
American municipal police officers
Crimes in Texas